Fyodor Dmitriyevich Klement (or Feodor Klement; 12 June 1903, Saint Petersburg – 28 June 1973, Tartu) was a Soviet and Estonian physicist and academician.

From 1951 to 1970, he was the rector of Tartu University.

He was a member of the Estonian Academy of Sciences.

References

1903 births
1973 deaths
Scientists from Saint Petersburg
Rectors of the University of Tartu
Saint Petersburg State University alumni
Academic staff of the University of Tartu
Members of the Central Committee of the Communist Party of Estonia
Fourth convocation members of the Supreme Soviet of the Soviet Union
Fifth convocation members of the Supreme Soviet of the Soviet Union
Sixth convocation members of the Supreme Soviet of the Soviet Union
Heroes of Socialist Labour
Recipients of the Order of Lenin
Recipients of the Order of the Red Banner of Labour
Estonian physicists
Soviet physicists
Burials at Raadi cemetery